The American Mall is a 2008 MTV musical film that debuted on August 11, 2008.

Overview
Produced by the same team behind Disney's High School Musical film series, The American Mall is conceptually very similar, as it focuses on several teenage characters and their daily struggles, with comic elements and musical numbers. The central plot thread of the film is that the two main characters, Ally and Joey, are musically talented but face many personal obstacles to attaining success. The teenage characters are all mall employees - Ally works at her mother's music shop, and Joey and his friends work on the night custodial staff.

The film was filmed in Provo, Utah at Provo Towne Centre.

The song "Get Your Rock On" was released as Rock Band DLC on August 19, 2008.

Cast
 Nina Dobrev as Ally Shepherd
 Rob Mayes as Joey
 Autumn Reeser as Madison
 Bianca Collins as Mia
 Neil Haskell as Drew
 Yassmin Alers as Erin
 Al Sapienza as Max
 Brooke Lyons as Dori
 Bresha Webb as Penny
 Blythe Auffarth as Alexa
 Lauren Storm
Rodney To as Ben
David Baum as Stavros
Wade Allain-Marcus as Rick

Singles
 2008: "Survivor" - Ally
 2008: "Get Your Rock On" - Joey & Janitors
 2008: "Don't Hold Back" - Ally, Joey, Mia, Madison, Ben, & Janitors

References

External links
 
 
 
 Interview with Nina Dobrev by AOL Canada

2008 television films
2008 films
2008 comedy-drama films
2000s musical films
American comedy-drama films
American musical comedy films
American romantic comedy films
American romantic musical films
American teen comedy films
American teen romance films
Films shot in Utah
MTV Films films
American drama television films
2000s English-language films
Films directed by Shawn Ku
2000s American films